This is a list of years in Chad.

Independence

French colony of Chad

19th century

18th century

The Sahelian Empires
1700s
1600s
1500s
1400s
1300s
1200s
1100s

Early history
BC Chad - Early AD Chad

See also
List of years by country

 
Chad history-related lists
Chad